Rocky Gerung (born 20 January 1959) is an Indonesian philosopher, academic and public intellectual.

Early life 
Rocky began studying at the University of Indonesia in 1979. He first entered the department of political science, which at that time joined the Faculty of Social Sciences, before deciding to move to the department of philosophy and graduated in 1986. During college, Rocky was close to the socialist-leaning activists such as Marsillam Simanjuntak, Hariman Siregar, and others.

Careers 
After graduating, Rocky taught in the department as a non-permanent lecturer until the beginning of 2015. He stopped teaching due to the issuance of Law No. 14 of 2005 which requires a lecturer to have a minimum of a master's degree; whereas Rocky only holds a bachelor's degree. He was teaching courses such as the Seminar on Justice Theory, Political Philosophy, and Philosophy Research Methods; he also taught at the postgraduate program.

Together with figures such as Abdurrahman Wahid and Azyumardi Azra, Rocky co-founded the Setara Institute, a think tank in the field of democracy and human rights, in 2005. As a philosopher, one of Rocky's fields of study was the philosophy of feminism. He wrote a lot in Jurnal Perempuan, a publication managed by the Women's Journal Foundation and founded by Gadis Arivia, his colleague at the University of Indonesia.

Notable works 
Books:

 Fay, Brian; Rocky Gerung; dan Budi Murdono (1991). "Teori Sosial dan Praktek Politik". Jakarta: Penerbit Graffiti.
 Saraswati, L. G.; dan Rocky Gerung (2006). "Hak Asasi Manusia: Teori, Hukum, Kasus". Depok: Filsafat UI Press.

Journal:

 Gerung, R. (2007). "Pluralisme dan Konsekwensinya: Catatan Kaki untuk Filsafat Politik’ Nurcholish Madjid”." Paper PSIK Universitas Paramadina.
 Gerung, R. (2008). "Feminisme versus Kearifan Lokal." Jurnal Perempuan 57.
 Gerung, R. (2010). "Representasi, Kedaulatan, dan Etika Publik." Jentera Jurnal Hukum 20 (5).
 Gerung, R. (2014). "Feminist Ethics against Stigma of Theocracy-Patriarchy: a Reflection of 2014 Presidential Election." Jurnal Perempuan 19 (3): 175-182.
 Gerung, R. (2016). "Feminist Pedagogy: A Political Position." Jurnal Perempuan 21 (3): 265-271.

Controversies

Reporting of Rocky to the police 
On 1 December 2021, the Movement of Nusantara Advocates (Perekat Nusantara) officially reported Rocky Gerung and four other opposition figures Refly Harun, Adi Masardi, Natalius Pigai, and Hersubeno Arief to the Indonesian National Police at 11:00 AM local time for their hate speeches, especially those directed against Romo Benny Susetyo, the special staff of the Pancasila Ideology Education Body's directing council for intervening the Indonesian Ulema Council (MUI), and also including Bishops' Conference of Indonesia (KWI) and the Catholic Church. Perekat Nusantara also additionally reported Rocky's YouTube channel, Rocky Gerung Official.

In his YouTube channel, Rocky reacts to the reports of him by Perekat Nusantara by saying: "It is a stupid thing. [It is] useless". Rocky also said that the current president of Indonesia, Joko Widodo, had failed to embody the equality of all Indonesian citizens. Romo Benny threatened to arrest Rocky and other four figures of the so-called "pro-democracy movement" but Nicho Silalahi said that Jesus Christ is merciful even to the opponents. Emanuel Herdiyanto also said that Romo Benny's post about MUI were his personal opinions rather than the Catholic Church's stance. According to the Catholic activist Leonardus Sugiman, Romo Benny must be thankful to the pro-democracy figures including Rocky, and placing himself as an independent figure and an enlightener for all Catholic practitioners.

References

External links 

 Profile in Tirto.id
 Literature collections di Google Scholar
 Lilin yang Kian Terang Menjelang Padam, orasi kebudayaan Rocky pada 20 Mei 2017 di Jakarta.

1959 births
Indonesian essayists
Living people
20th-century male writers
Minahasa people
People from Manado
University of Indonesia alumni
Indonesian atheism activists
Conservatism in Indonesia
Indonesian conspiracy theorists